Zarnuqa, also Zarnuga, was a Palestinian Arab village in the Ramle Subdistrict. It was depopulated on 27–28 May 1948 during the 1948 Arab–Israeli War.

Location
Zarnuqa was located 10 km southwest of Ramla.

History
Ceramics from the  Late Bronze Age and the   Persian  era  have been found here.

Building, winepress and ceramics from the Byzantine era have been found, as have  early Islamic remains.

Ottoman era
Tombs, from Late  Ottoman period (sixteenth–nineteenth centuries CE) have been excavated, as has a building with a  kiln and pottery dating to the eighteenth–nineteenth centuries.

The mosque of the village was built  by Shaykh Ahmad al-Rahhal. A two-line poem inscribed in nashki  script, dated the construction of the mosque to  1207 H. (1792-1793 C.E.).

The village appeared as an unnamed village on the map of Pierre Jacotin compiled in 1799. 
Some of the inhabitants of Zarnuqa were Egyptians who arrived in Palestine with the army of Ibrahim Pasha. In 1838, Zernukah  was noted as a village in the Gaza area.

In 1863 Victor Guérin  found  that  Zarnuqa had 300 inhabitants, and  that it was surrounded by tobacco plantations. A sanctuary was dedicated to a Sheik Mohammed.

An Ottoman village list of about 1870 counted 107 houses and a population of  267, though  the population count included men only. Passing by, in 1871, Charles Warren described travelling in the area: "We passed through olive groves and gardens past Zernuka, until crossing over some undulating hills we came across the village Akir..."

In 1882, the PEF's Survey of Western Palestine described Zarnuqa as a large adobe village "with cactus hedges around it and wells in the gardens." In 1890, the region between Zarnuqa and Ramle, a stretch of 10,000 dunams, was described by Zionist sources as an uncultivated wasteland.  In March 1892, a dispute  erupted between the shepherds of Zarnuqa and the Jewish farmers of the newly established moshava of Rehovot, which was finally resolved in the courts. In 1913, a violent clash, which according to the Jewish side, was  sparked by the theft of grapes from a Rishon LeZion vineyard resulted in the deaths of two Jews from Rehovot and an Arab of Zarnuqa. However, documents recently discovered in Istanbul  archives gives the Arab version: they said that the Jews "wanted to strip the camel owner of their clothes, money and camels, but these men refused to give their camels and escaped from Lun Kara with their camels, protecting each other [to seek refuge with] men of the law… The above mentioned Jews attacked our villages, robbed and looted our property, killed and even damaged the family honor, all this in a manner we find hard to put in words." They further wrote: ""By payments they do whatever they want, as if they have a small government of their own in the country."

British Mandate era
In the 1922 census of Palestine conducted by the British Mandate authorities, Zarnuqa'  had a population of 967 inhabitants, all  Muslims,  increasing in the 1931 census to 1,952; still all Muslims, in a total of 414 houses.

In 1926, the Jewish National Fund purchased land from residents of Zarnuqa, and by 1931 had established on that land the first workers moshav known as Kfar Marmorek, now a suburb of Rehovot, in which ten families evicted from Kinneret in 1931 were resettled. In 1929, Zarnuqa had 1,122 dunams of citrus orchards and most of its economic growth derived from citriculture. In 1934, Zionist writer  Ze'ev Smilansky attributed the modernization of the village to its proximity to Rehovot and land sales to Jews by both effendis and fellahin. Advanced farming technologies were introduced under the tuition of their Jewish neighbors.

The village had two elementary schools, with one of them for boys (founded in 1924) and the other one for girls, founded in 1943, initially with 65 students. In 1945, the boy school had  252 students.

In the  1945 statistics, the village was counted with Gibton, together they had a total population of 2,620; 2,380 Muslims and 240 Jews.

The land ownership of the village before occupation in dunams:

Types of land use in dunams in the village in 1945:

1948 and aftermath
At the beginning of December 1947, the residents of Zarnuqa considered entering into a non-belligerency pact with Rehovot but apparently it was not formalized. In April 1948, Arab irregulars moved into the village. The Dar Shurbaji clan was in favor of the village surrendering its weapons and accept protection by Haganah but others objected. Women, children and the elderly were evacuated to the nearby village of Yibna, leaving the Shurbajis and several dozen armed men from other clans. Zarnuqa was depopulated on 27–28 May by the Givati Brigade during the 1948 Arab–Israeli War. One account in Al HaMishmar described how a soldier fired with a Sten gun at three people (one old man, old woman and a child) and how the villagers were taken out from the houses and had to stay in the sun, in hunger and thirst, until they surrendered the weapons they claimed they did not have. They were then expelled towards Yibna. In total, six died and 22 were taken prisoners. The day after, the inhabitants returned and recounted that the Yibna villagers saw them as traitors. The Zarnuqa villagers saw their village being ransacked by Jewish soldiers and nearby settlers. They were expelled again and the houses were demolished the month after.

The family of the Shaqaqi brothers, Fathi (one of the founders of the Palestinian Islamic Jihad) and the political scientist Khalil Ibrahim, was from Zarnuqa. They fled in the face of rumours of massacres of Palestinians by Yishuv troops and expected to return after the hostilities ended. They were not permitted to come back. Haidar Eid, Associate Professor at al-Aqsa University in Gaza, states that his parent were evicted from the village by members of the Haganah and Stern gang who told them: "Leave your homes or we will kill and rape you".    
  
After the establishment of Israel, the Zarnuqa ma'abara was established on the site to house Jewish refugees from Eastern Europe and Arab lands.

References

Bibliography

  
 
  

 

  

 
Johnson,  Penny:  Take My Camel: The Disappearing Camels of Jerusalem and Jaffa, jerusalemquarterly.org

External links
 Welcome To Zarnuqa
 Zarnuqa,  Zochrot
Survey of Western Palestine, Map 16:    IAA, Wikimedia commons 
 Zarnuqa from the Khalil Sakakini Cultural Center

Arab villages depopulated during the 1948 Arab–Israeli War
District of Ramla